Crystal Lake South High School, often referred to as "South" or "CLS," is one of three high schools in Crystal Lake, Illinois, and currently has a body of roughly 1916 students. As Crystal Lake's second oldest school, it was constructed from 1976 to 1978 and opened in September 1978  after Crystal Lake Community High School, now Crystal Lake Central High School, split into two schools due to the pressures of the population growth in the communities it served, Crystal Lake, a part of Lake in the Hills and a small portion of Algonquin. South graduated its first class in 1979  - this class consisted of approximately 250 seniors who were transferred from Crystal Lake Central High School.   South graduated its first class who attended all four years in 1982.

After the community's school split, the South Gators and Central Tigers became rivals in the Fox Valley Conference. Though recently, focus of rivalry has primarily shifted to the Cary-Grove High School Trojans and the Prairie Ridge Wolves due to vastly increased competition in football games between the two schools. However, an underlying tone of competition still vibrates between the two Crystal Lake schools.

The city of Crystal Lake has grown rapidly since South first opened it doors. The school reached its structural capacity in 2002. A new addition opened for the 2003-2004 school year, with several dozen new classrooms. However, due to the phenomenal growth of the city, the addition was already insufficient by the 2005-2006 school year (the graduating class of 2004 consisted of 366 students, class of 2006 had 435 students, and the class of 2009 contained approximately 540 students). The final phase of the 2003-2004 additions was opened in the 2006-2007 school year.  The "Lower level" under C-Hall added 10 classrooms and over 100 lockers.

In 2018, the Lower Level was renovated and reopened as a separate school, due to shrinking population in Crystal Lake.

Crystal Lake South High School's mascot is the "Gator". This mascot was chosen in 1976 by a poll of students who would attend South when it first opened.  South was sued by the University of Florida (CLS allegedly used their logo without permission to sell it on merchandise) and the logo was changed. From this, arose a contest; graduates, current students, and the community got to design and enter logo's to be voted upon for the new one. The new logo was chosen and was used in place of the old one beginning in the 2011-2012 school year.  During the summer of 2016, the entrance to the school was rebuilt, and a bronze gator statue was placed outside of the school.

In 2017, the baseball team won the IHSA Class 4A baseball state championship.

Notable alumni
 Paul Lekics - Class of 1991. Retired professional soccer player for the Richmond Kickers and Chicago Fire. Former assistant soccer coach for California State University, Stanislaus
 Scott Olsen - Class of 2002 - Major League pitcher 2005-2010
 Randy Salerno - Class of 1981 -  Former news anchor for WGN-TV and WBBM-TV in Chicago
 Jim Verraros - Class of 2001 - Singer/actor of American Idol fame
Dennis Gardeck- American football player for the Arizona Cardinals
John Larimer - Class of 2003. Navy Petty Officer Third Class and victim of the 2012 Aurora, Colorado shooting
Alex LoSchiavo - Two-time Emmy-award winning associate producer. 
Jon Jorgenson - Class of 2009 - Stage actor, played the role of "Sky" in the Broadway cast of Mamma Mia!

References

Athletic Illinois State Champions
 1981 Boys Golf
 2017 Baseball 4A
 2019 Boys Soccer

Public high schools in Illinois
Schools in McHenry County, Illinois
Educational institutions established in 1978
Crystal Lake, Illinois
1978 establishments in Illinois